.dd was the assigned country code top-level domain (ccTLD) for the German Democratic Republic (East Germany). It was chosen based on the ISO 3166-1 alpha-2 code for the German Democratic Republic, the letters coming from the German name of the country, . In accordance with IANA policy, .dd was therefore available to be assigned as the country code top-level domain (ccTLD) for East Germany. However, this was never done, and so .dd was never added to the root nameservers. Its only use was internally in an isolated network among the universities of Jena and Dresden.

With the reunification of Germany, East Germany became part of the Federal Republic of Germany (West Germany), which had already been assigned the ccTLD .de. The ISO 3166-1 code "DD" was withdrawn in 1990.

References

External links
  discussion on Usenet (German)

Country code top-level domains
Mass media in East Germany

sv:Toppdomän#D